Break Point is a U.S. comedy film directed by Jay Karas. The film stars Jeremy Sisto and David Walton as two estranged brothers (and former tennis partners) who reunite and decide to make a run at a grand slam tournament.

The film first premiered at South by Southwest Film Festival on March 8, 2014. The film was released on July 21, 2015 on video on demand prior to the film being released in a limited release on September 4, 2015.

Plot
Brash man-child Jimmy Price knows his days as a doubles tennis player are nearly finished. Since he's burned practically all of his bridges on the pro circuit, it's a huge blow when his latest partner drops him. With no other option, he tries to revive his career by convincing his estranged brother (and former tennis partner) Darren to join him on the court. With the help of an unusual 11-year-old named Barry, the duo make a go at a grand slam tournament.

Cast

 Jeremy Sisto as Jimmy
 Adam DeVine as Nick
 David Walton as Darren
 Amy Smart as Heather
 J. K. Simmons as Jack
 Joshua Rush as Barry
 Chris Parnell as Jay LaRoche
 Vincent Ventresca as Gary

Release
The film had its world premiere at the South by Southwest Film Festival on March 8, 2014. The film went on to premiere at the Dallas International Film Festival on April 11, 2014. Newport Beach International Film Festival on April 25, 2014. and the Nantucket Film Festival on June 25, 2014. in April 2015, it was announced Broad Green Pictures had acquire distribution rights to the film. The film was released on July 21, 2015 on video on demand prior to the film being released in a limited release on September 4, 2015.

References

External links

2014 films
2010s sports comedy films
American sports comedy films
Broad Green Pictures films
Tennis films
2014 directorial debut films
2014 comedy films
2010s English-language films
Films directed by Jay Karas
2010s American films